George Bogislaus Staël von Holstein (born 6 December 1685 in Narva; died 17 December 1763 in Malmö) was a Swedish baron and field marshal. He was the Governor of Malmöhus County from 1754 to 1763.

Family
George Bosiglaus Staël von Holstein was born on 6 December 1685, the son of Lt. Col. Johan Staël von Holstein and Julia Helena von der Pahlen. He was a member of the Staël von Holstein noble house which had then only recently joined the Swedish nobility.

During his captivity in Russia he married the Countess Ingeborg Christina Horn af Rantzien in 1710, a daughter of the Field Marshal Henning Rudolf Horn von Rantzien, who had been taken captive with his daughters by the Russians during the Great Northern War.

In 1722 Staël von Holstein planned a marriage with Sofia Elisabeth Ridderschantz. However, the marriage was broken off because his wife Ingeborg from Russia, where she had been held captive to that point, returned. In 1731 Staël von Holstein was raised to the rank of baron.

In 1761 his first wife died, and Staël married Sofia Elisabeth Ridderschantz. Anna Helena Juliana, the daughter of George Bogislaus Staël von Holstein, died at the age of five. With her this branch of the Staël von Holstein noble family died out.

Military career

Staël von Holstein began his military career on 20 February 1700 as a volunteer in the Swedish household guard. He was promoted to Unteroffizier (roughly equivalent to corporal) in the artillery. Staël von Holstein became a cornet in the Dragoon regiment of the province Ingria which was under the command of Otto Vellingk. He participated in the campaign in Livonia against the Russian and Saxon armies. He was promoted to Lieutenant in 1702 and a year later to Captain in the infantry regiment of Adam de la Gardie. This regiment was used in 1704 to free the besieged city of Narva from Russian troops. In April he was appointed commander of the grenadier company of this regiment.

The Swedish attack failed and Staël von Holstein was captured. He was held captive in prison camps in Siberia and later in the region of Moscow. Staël von Holstein succeeded in being exchanged for a Russian officer in 1711. His wife, her sisters and his father-in-law were not allowed to leave Russia, however. After his return Staël von Holstein was under the direct command of the Swedish King Charles XII, who was in exile in Bender and was dispatched by him to the Skaraborg regiment.

In 1713 Staël von Holstein was promoted to Lieutenant Colonel and in 1715 he invaded Schonen with the Skaraborg regiment. Two years later he was appointed colonel. In 1718 he participated with his regiment in the campaign against Norway and took part in the Siege of Frederiksten.

In 1719 the Skaraborg regiment was garrisoned in Göteborg. The attack of the Danish captain Peter Wessel Tordenskiold on the fortress of Nya Elfsborg was repulsed by his commander Johan Abraham Lillie with all his forces. The artillery division of the Skaraborg regiment began a counter-attack on the Danish navy on 24 July. They were so taken by surprise by artillery fire from land that the fleet withdrew and repulsed the attack.

In 1720 Staël parted from the Swedish army and served in the following years under Duke Karl Friedrich von Holstein. He was a major general and commander in his bodyguard.

In 1733 Staël von Holstein was appointed colonel and commandant of Kalmar Castle. A year later he was governor of Kalmar.

Staël was appointed major-general in 1734. In 1742 he was the leader of the political group the Caps.

In 1743 Staël von Holstein was promoted to lieutenant general. He was also a Knight in the Royal Order of the Seraphim. In 1754 he was appointed governor of Malmöhus län and commandant of Malmö. He remained in this position until his death.

Civilian life
In 1737 Staël built a textile factory in Kalmar. In 1742 he founded the glasswork company Kosta Glasbruk together with the governor of Kronobergs län, Anders Koskull Kosta. Later Staël bought in the province of Halland a large property as a family seat. This was situated in the neighborhood of Vapnö and is still in the property of his family.

References

1685 births
1763 deaths
Swedish military personnel
Barons of Sweden
Swedish people of German descent
Governors of Malmöhus County
Age of Liberty people